Abcélvio Rodrigues (born 26 May 1957) is a Brazilian athlete. He competed in the men's triple jump at the 1984 Summer Olympics and the 1988 Summer Olympics.

References

1957 births
Living people
Athletes (track and field) at the 1984 Summer Olympics
Athletes (track and field) at the 1988 Summer Olympics
Brazilian male triple jumpers
Olympic athletes of Brazil
Place of birth missing (living people)